Anglo-Sikh War may refer to:

 First Anglo-Sikh War, 1845–46
 Second Anglo-Sikh War, 1848–49